Mitrofanovka is a rural locality (a settlement) in Annovskoye Rural Settlement, Bobrovsky District, Voronezh Oblast, Russia. The population was 143 as of 2010. There are 2 streets.

Geography 
Mitrofanovka is located 34 km southeast of Bobrov (the district's administrative centre) by road. Troynya is the nearest rural locality.

References 

Rural localities in Bobrovsky District